The M-1 motorway or the Islamabad–Peshawar Motorway is an east–west motorway in Pakistan, connecting Peshawar to Islamabad–Rawalpindi. 

The motorway was constructed during President Pervez Musharraf's rule at a cost of Rs. 13 billion, and was opened in October 2007.

History

Work on M-1 was started during Nawaz Sharif's tenure in 1997, and the contract was awarded to Turkish company Bayindar. However, the work stopped after his government was dismissed by Army chief Gen.Pervez Musharraf in october 1999. Progress remained very slow and not much work was done between 1999 and 2003.

Work restarted in 2003 after the  contract was re-awarded to a consortium PMC-JV during President Pervez Musharraf's tenure. A plan was made to connect the existing M-2 motorway with the Torkham border. In 2004, the Senate body was briefed on a plan to connect Gwadar Port with the existing motorway infrastructure. Hence, it highlighted importance of M-1 motorway in this context.

It was completed at a cost of Rs. 13 billion, and was inaugurated by President Pervez Musharraf on 30 October 2007.

Route

The M-1 originates northeast of Peshawar at the junction with the Peshawar Ring Road. It then crosses over the Kabul River in an eastern direction passing the cities of Charsadda, Risalpur, Swabi, and Rashakai before crossing the Indus River. The M-1 leaves Khyber Pakhtunkhwa province and enters into Punjab province, where it passes through Attock, Burhan, and Hasan Abdal. The M-1 terminates near Islamabad as a continuation of the M-2 motorway. 

The whole stretch of the M-1 consists of six lanes, with a number of rest stops along the route. The M-1 has 14 interchanges - at Airport Link Road, Islamabad, AWT/ Sanjiani/ Paswal, Burma Bhatar, Burhan (Hassan Abadal/ Kamra), Hazara Expressway (E-35), Ghazi, Chachh, Sawabi, Rashakai, Charsadda, the Peshawar Northern Bypass and Peshawar Ring Road. At Brahma Bahtar Interchange, the Brahma Bahtar-Yarik Motorway leads towards Dera Ismail Khan. 

There are three major bridges along the route along the Haro, Indus and Kabul rivers, 18 flyovers, 27 small bridges, 137 underpasses and 571 culverts. 10 service areas (five on the each side of the motorway) are present along the route.

Junctions and interchanges

See also
Motorways of Pakistan
National Highways of Pakistan
Transport in Pakistan
National Highway Authority

References

External links

AH1
M01